Grenada is an island country in the West Indies in the Caribbean Sea at the southern end of the Grenadines island chain. Grenada consists of the island of Grenada itself, two smaller islands, Carriacou and Petite Martinique, and several small islands which lie to the north of the main island and are a part of the Grenadines. It is located northwest of Trinidad and Tobago, northeast of Venezuela and southwest of Saint Vincent and the Grenadines. Its capital is St. George's. Grenada is also known as the "Island of Spice" due to its production of nutmeg and mace crops.

Before the arrival of Europeans in the Americas, Grenada was inhabited by the indigenous peoples from South America. Christopher Columbus sighted Grenada in 1498 during his third voyage to the Americas. Following several unsuccessful attempts by Europeans to colonise the island due to resistance from resident Island Caribs, French settlement and colonisation began in 1649 and continued for the next century. On 10 February 1763, Grenada was ceded to the British under the Treaty of Paris. British rule continued until 1974 (except for a brief French takeover between 1779 and 1783). However, on 3 March 1967, it was granted full autonomy over its internal affairs as an Associated State, and from 1958 to 1962 Grenada was part of the Federation of the West Indies, a short-lived federation of British West Indian colonies.

Independence was granted on 7 February 1974 under the leadership of Eric Gairy, who became the first prime minister of Grenada of the sovereign state. The new country became a member of the Commonwealth of Nations, with Queen Elizabeth II as head of state and is currently headed by King Charles III, King of Grenada. In March 1979, the Marxist–Leninist New Jewel Movement overthrew Gairy's government in a bloodless coup d'état and established the People's Revolutionary Government (PRG), headed by Maurice Bishop as prime minister. Bishop was later arrested and executed by members of the People's Revolutionary Army (PRA), prompting a U.S.-led invasion in October 1983. Since then, the island has returned to a parliamentary representative democracy and has remained politically stable.

Etymology
The origin of the name "Grenada" is obscure, but it is likely that Spanish sailors named the island for the Andalusian city of Granada. The name "Granada" was recorded by Spanish maps in the 1520s and referred to the islands to the north as Los Granadillos ("Little Granadas"); although those named islands were deemed the property of the King of Spain, there are no records to suggest the Spanish ever attempted to settle Grenada. The French maintained the name (as "La Grenade" in French) after settlement and colonisation in 1649. On 10 February 1763, the island of La Grenade was ceded to the British under the Treaty of Paris. The British renamed it "Grenada", one of many place-name anglicisations they made there.

It carried at least two other European names during the Age of Discovery. The island was given its first by Christopher Columbus who sighted it on his third voyage to the region in 1498 and named it "La Concepción" in honour of the Virgin Mary. It is said that he may have actually named it "Assumpción", but it is uncertain, as he is said to have sighted what are now Grenada and Tobago from a distance and named them both at the same time. However, it became accepted that he named Tobago "Assumpción" and Grenada "La Concepción". The year after, Italian explorer Amerigo Vespucci travelled through the region with the Spanish explorer Alonso de Ojeda and mapmaker Juan de la Cosa. Vespucci is reported to have renamed the island "Mayo", although this is the only map where the name appears.

The indigenous Arawak that once lived on the island before the arrival of the Europeans gave the name Camajuya.

History

Pre-Columbian history
Grenada was first populated by peoples from South America, possibly during the Caribbean Archaic Age, although definitive evidence is lacking. The earliest potential human presence comes from proxy evidence of lake cores, beginning ~3600 BC. Less ephemeral, permanent villages began around ~AD 100–200. The population peaked between AD 750–1250, with major changes in population afterwards, potentially the result of regional droughts and/or the "Carib Invasion", although the latter rests on highly circumstantial evidence.

European arrival
In 1498, Christopher Columbus was the first European to report sighting Grenada during his third voyage, naming it 'La Concepción', but Amerigo Vespucci may have renamed it 'Mayo' in 1499. Although it was deemed the property of the King of Spain, there are no records to suggest the Spanish attempted to settle, although various Europeans are known to have passed and both fought and/or traded with the indigenous peoples there. The first known settlement attempt was a failed venture by the English in 1609, but they were massacred and driven away by the native "Carib" peoples.

French colony (1649–1763)

In 1649, a French expedition of 203 men from Martinique, led by Jacques Dyel du Parquet, founded a permanent settlement on Grenada. They signed a peace treaty with the Carib chief Kairouane, but within months conflict broke out between the two communities. This lasted until 1654 when the island was completely subjugated by the French. The indigenous peoples who survived either left for neighbouring islands or retreated to more remote parts of Grenada, where they ultimately disappeared during the 1700s. Warfare continued during the 1600s between the French on Grenada and the Caribs of present-day Dominica and St. Vincent and the Grenadines.

Chocolate was brought to Grenada in 1714 with the introduction of cocoa beans.

The French named their new colony La Grenade, and the economy was initially based on sugar cane and indigo, worked by African slaves. The French established a capital known as Fort Royal (later St. George's). To shelter from hurricanes, the French navy would often take refuge in the capital's natural harbour, as no nearby French islands had a natural harbour to compare with that of Fort Royal. The British captured Grenada during the Seven Years' War in 1762.

British colonial period

Early colonial period

Grenada was formally ceded to Britain by the Treaty of Paris in 1763. The French re-captured the island during the American Revolutionary War, after Comte d'Estaing won the bloody land and naval Battle of Grenada in July 1779. However, the island was restored to Britain with the Treaty of Versailles in 1783. A decade later, dissatisfaction with British rule led to a pro-French revolt in 1795–96 led by Julien Fédon, which was successfully defeated by the British.

As Grenada's economy grew, more and more African slaves were forcibly transported to the island. Britain eventually outlawed the slave trade within the British Empire in 1807, and slavery was completely outlawed in 1833, leading to the emancipation of all enslaved by 1838. In an effort to ameliorate the subsequent labour shortage, migrants from India were brought to Grenada in 1857.

Nutmeg was introduced to Grenada in 1843, when a merchant ship called in on its way to England from the East Indies. The ship had a small quantity of nutmeg trees on board which they left in Grenada, and this was the beginning of Grenada's nutmeg industry that now supplies nearly 40% of the world's annual crop.

Later colonial period
In 1877, Grenada was made a Crown colony. Theophilus A. Marryshow founded the Representative Government Association (RGA) in 1917 to agitate for a new and participative constitutional dispensation for the Grenadian people. Partly as a result of Marryshow's lobbying, the Wood Commission of 1921–22 concluded that Grenada was ready for constitutional reform in the form of a modified Crown colony government. This modification granted Grenadians the right to elect five of the 15 members of the Legislative Council, on a restricted property franchise enabling the wealthiest 4% of adult Grenadians to vote. Marryshow was named a Commander of the Order of the British Empire (CBE) in 1943.

In 1950, Eric Gairy founded the Grenada United Labour Party (GULP), initially as a trade union, which led the 1951 general strike for better working conditions. This sparked great unrest, and so many buildings were set ablaze that the disturbances became known as the "red sky" days. The British authorities decided to call in military reinforcements to help regain control of the situation. On 10 October 1951, Grenada held its first general elections on the basis of universal adult suffrage, with Gairy's party winning six of the eight seats contested.

From 1958 to 1962, Grenada was part of the Federation of the West Indies. After the federation's collapse, Grenada was granted full autonomy over its internal affairs as an Associated State on 3 March 1967. Herbert Blaize of the Grenada National Party (GNP) was the first Premier of the Associated State of Grenada from March to August 1967. Eric Gairy served as Premier from August 1967 until February 1974.

Post-independence era

Independence was granted on 7 February 1974 under the leadership of Eric Gairy, who became the first prime minister of Grenada. Grenada opted to remain within the Commonwealth, retaining Queen Elizabeth as Monarch, represented locally by a governor-general. Civil conflict gradually broke out between Eric Gairy's government and some opposition parties, including the Marxist New Jewel Movement (NJM). Gairy and the GULP won the 1976 Grenadian general election, albeit with a reduced majority; however, the opposition deemed the results invalid due to fraud and the violent intimidation performed by the so-called 'Mongoose Gang', a private militia loyal to Gairy.

On 13 March 1979, whilst Gairy was out of the country, the NJM launched a bloodless coup which removed Gairy, suspended the constitution, and established a People's Revolutionary Government (PRG), headed by Maurice Bishop who declared himself prime minister. His Marxist–Leninist government established close ties with Cuba, Nicaragua, and other communist bloc countries. All political parties except for the New Jewel Movement were banned and no elections were held during the four years of PRG rule.

Invasion by the United States (1983)

Coup and execution of Maurice Bishop
Some years later, a dispute developed between Bishop and certain high-ranking members of the NJM. Though Bishop cooperated with Cuba and the USSR on various trade and foreign policy issues, he sought to maintain a "non-aligned" status.  Hardline Marxist party members, including communist Deputy Prime Minister Bernard Coard, deemed Bishop insufficiently revolutionary and demanded that he either step down or enter into a power-sharing arrangement.

On 16 October 1983, Bernard Coard and his wife, Phyllis, backed by the Grenadian Army, led a coup against the government of Maurice Bishop and placed Bishop under house arrest. These actions led to street demonstrations in various parts of the island because Bishop had widespread support from the population. Because Bishop was a widely popular leader, he was freed by impassioned supporters who marched en masse to his guarded residence from a rally in the capital's central square. Bishop then led the crowd to the island's military headquarters to reassert his power. Grenadian soldiers were dispatched in armoured vehicles by the Coard faction to retake the fort. A confrontation between soldiers and civilians at the fort ended in gunfire and panic. Three soldiers and at least eight civilians died in the tumult that also injured 100 others, a school-sponsored study later found. When the initial shooting ended with Bishop's surrender, he and a group of seven of his closest supporters were taken prisoner and executed by firing squad. Besides Bishop, the group included three of his cabinet ministers, a trade union leader and three service-industry workers.

After the execution of Bishop, the People's Revolutionary Army (PRA) formed a military Marxist government with General Hudson Austin as chairman. The army declared a four-day total curfew, during which anyone leaving their home without approval would be shot on sight.

United States and allied response and reaction

US President Ronald Reagan stated that particularly worrying was the presence of Cuban construction workers and military personnel building a  airstrip on Grenada. Bishop had stated the purpose of the airstrip was to allow commercial jets to land, but some US military analysts argued that the only reason for constructing such a long and reinforced runway was so that it could be used by heavy military transport planes. The contractors, American and European companies, and the EEC, which provided partial funding, all claimed the airstrip did not have military capabilities. Reagan claimed that Cuba, under the direction of the Soviet Union, would use Grenada as a refuelling stop for Cuban and Soviet aeroplanes loaded with weapons destined for Central American communist insurgents.

The Organization of Eastern Caribbean States (OECS), Barbados, and Jamaica all appealed to the United States for assistance. On 25 October 1983, combined forces from the United States and from the Regional Security System (RSS) based in Barbados invaded Grenada in an operation codenamed Operation Urgent Fury. The US stated this was done at the behest of Barbados, Dominica and Governor-General Paul Scoon. Scoon had requested the invasion through secret diplomatic channels, but it was not made public for his safety. Progress was rapid, and within four days the Americans had removed the military government of Hudson Austin.

The invasion was criticised by the governments of Britain, Trinidad and Tobago, and Canada. The United Nations General Assembly condemned it as "a flagrant violation of international law" by a vote of 108 to 9, with 27 abstentions. The United Nations Security Council considered a similar resolution, which was supported by 11 nations. However, the United States vetoed the motion.

Post-invasion arrests
After the invasion, the pre-revolutionary Grenadian constitution came into operation once again. Eighteen members of the PRG/PRA were arrested on charges related to the murder of Maurice Bishop and seven others. The 18 included the top political leadership of Grenada at the time of the execution, along with the entire military chain of command directly responsible for the operation that led to the executions. Fourteen were sentenced to death, one was found not guilty, and three were sentenced to 45 years in prison. The death sentences were eventually commuted to terms of imprisonment. Those in prison have become known as 'the Grenada 17'.

Since 1983
When US troops withdrew from Grenada in December 1983, Governor-General Scoon appointed an interim advisory council chaired by Nicholas Brathwaite to organise new elections. The first democratic elections since 1976 were held in December 1984, and were won by the New National Party under Herbert Blaize, who served as prime minister until his death in December 1989.

Ben Jones briefly succeeded Blaize as prime minister and served until the March 1990 election.  This election was won by the National Democratic Congress under Nicholas Brathwaite, who served as prime minister until he resigned in February 1995. He was succeeded by George Brizan for a brief period until the June 1995 election which was won by the New National Party under Keith Mitchell, who went on to win the 1999 and 2003 elections, serving for a record 13 years until 2008. Mitchell re-established relations with Cuba and also reformed the country's banking system, which had come under criticism over potential money laundering concerns.

In 2000–02, much of the controversy of the late 1970s and early 1980s was once again brought into the public consciousness with the opening of the truth and reconciliation commission. The commission was chaired by a Roman Catholic priest, Father Mark Haynes, and was tasked with uncovering injustices arising from the PRA, Bishop's regime, and before. It held a number of hearings around the country. Brother Robert Fanovich, head of Presentation Brothers' College (PBC) in St. George's, tasked some of his senior students with conducting a research project into the era and specifically into the fact that Maurice Bishop's body was never discovered. Paterson also uncovered that there was still a lot of resentment in Grenadian society resulting from the era and a feeling that there were many injustices still unaddressed.

On 7 September 2004, after being hurricane-free for 49 years, the island was directly hit by Hurricane Ivan. Ivan struck as a Category 3 hurricane, resulting in 39 deaths and damage or destruction to 90% of the island's homes. On 14 July 2005, Hurricane Emily, a Category 1 hurricane at the time, struck the northern part of the island with  winds, killing one person and causing an estimated US$110 million (EC$297 million) worth of damage. Agriculture, and in particular the nutmeg industry, suffered serious losses, but that event caused changes in crop management and it is hoped that as new nutmeg trees mature, the industry will gradually rebuild.

Mitchell was defeated in the 2008 election by the NDC under Tillman Thomas, however he won the 2013 Grenadian general election by a landslide and the NNP returned to power, winning again by another landslide in 2018. In March 2020, Grenada confirmed its first case of COVID-19 and, 13,921 cases and 217 deaths had been recorded.

On 23 June 2022, the NDC won the general election under Dickon Mitchell, who became prime minister the following day.

Geography

Its sister islands make up the southern section of the Grenadines, which include Carriacou, Petite Martinique, Ronde Island, Caille Island, Diamond Island, Large Island, Saline Island, and Frigate Island; the remaining islands to the north belong to St Vincent and the Grenadines. Most of the population lives on Grenada, and major towns there include the capital, St. George's, Grenville and Gouyave. The largest settlement on the sister islands is Hillsborough on Carriacou.

Grenada is of volcanic origin, as evident in its soil, mountainous interior, and several explosion craters, including Lake Antoine, Grand Etang Lake and Levera Pond. Other major mountains include Mount Granby and South East Mountain. Several small rivers with waterfalls flow into the sea from these mountains. The coastline contains several bays, most notably on the southern coast which is split into numerous thin peninsulas.

Grenada is home to four ecoregions: Windward Islands moist forests, Leeward Islands dry forests, Windward Islands dry forests, and Windward Islands xeric scrub. It had a 2018 Forest Landscape Integrity Index mean score of 4.22/10, ranking it 131st globally out of 172 countries.

Climate
The climate is tropical: hot and humid in the dry season and cooled by the moderate rainfall in the rainy season. Grenada, being on the southern edge of the hurricane belt, has suffered only three hurricanes in fifty years.

The most recent storms to hit Grenada have been Hurricane Ivan on 7 September 2004, causing severe damage and thirty-nine deaths, and Hurricane Emily on 14 July 2005, causing serious damage in Carriacou and in the north of Grenada, which had been relatively lightly affected by Hurricane Ivan.

Fauna

Like much of the Caribbean, Grenada is depauperate of large animals. However, native opossums, armadillos, and introduced mona monkeys and mongooses are common. It also boasts a rich avifauna of 184 bird species, with one endemic (Grenada dove), six introduced, and 116 rare or accidental.

Geology

Approximately 2 million years ago in the Pliocene era, the area of what is nowadays Grenada emerged from a shallow sea as a submarine volcano. In recent times, volcanic activity has been non-existent, except for some of its hot spring and underwater volcano Kick 'em Jenny. Most of Grenada's terrain is made up from volcanic activity that would have taken place 1–2 million years ago. There would have been many unknown volcanoes responsible for the formation of Grenada including Grenada's capital St. George's with its horseshoe-shaped harbour, the carenage. Two extinct volcanoes which are now crater lakes, Grand Etang Lake and Lake Antoine, would have also contributed towards the formation of Grenada.

Politics

Grenada is a Commonwealth realm with Charles III as head of state, represented locally by a governor-general. Executive power lies with the head of government, the prime minister. The governor-general role is largely ceremonial, while the prime minister is usually the leader of the largest party in Parliament.

The Parliament of Grenada consists of a Senate (13 members) and a House of Representatives (15 members). Senators are appointed by the government and the opposition, while the representatives are elected by the population for five-year terms. Grenada operates a multi-party system, with the largest parties being the centre-right New National Party (NNP) and the centre-left National Democratic Congress (NDC).

In February 2013, the governing National Democratic Congress (NDC) lost the election. The opposition New National Party (NNP) won all 15 seats in the general election. Keith Mitchell, leader of NNP, who had served three terms as prime minister between 1995 and 2008, returned to power. Mitchell has led NNP to win all 15 seats in the House of Representatives on three separate occasions. In November 2021, Prime Minister Keith Mitchell said that the upcoming general elections which are constitutionally due no later than June 2023, will be the last one for him.

Foreign relations

Grenada is a full and participating member of both the Caribbean Community (CARICOM) and the Organisation of Eastern Caribbean States (OECS).

The Commonwealth
Grenada is, along with much of the Caribbean region, a member of the Commonwealth of Nations. The organisation, which primarily consists of former British colonies, focuses on fostering international relations between its members.

Organization of American States (OAS)
Grenada is one of the 35 states which has ratified the OAS charter and is a member of the Organization. Grenada entered into the Inter-American system in 1975 according to the OAS's website.

Double Taxation Relief (CARICOM) Treaty
On 6 July 1994 at Sherbourne Conference Centre in St. Michael, Barbados, George Brizan signed the Double Taxation Relief (CARICOM) Treaty on behalf of the Government of Grenada. This treaty covered concepts such as taxes, residence, tax jurisdictions, capital gains, business profits, interest, dividends, royalties and other areas.

FATCA
On 30 June 2014, Grenada signed a Model 1 agreement with the United States of America in relation to Foreign Account Tax Compliance Act (FATCA).

ALBA 
In December 2014, Grenada joined Bolivarian Alliance for the Peoples of Our America (ALBA) as a full member. Prime Minister Mitchell said that the membership was a natural extension of the co-operation Grenada have had over the years with both Cuba and Venezuela.

Military
Grenada has no standing military, leaving typical military functions to the Royal Grenada Police Force (including a Special Service Unit) and the Coast Guard of Grenada.

In 2019, Grenada signed the UN treaty on the Prohibition of Nuclear Weapons.

Administrative divisions

Grenada is divided into six parishes: Carriacou and Petite Martinique (not pictured) have the status of a dependency.

Human rights

Homosexuality is illegal in Grenada and punishable by imprisonment.

Economy

Grenada has a small economy in which tourism is the major foreign exchange earner. Major short-term concerns are the rising fiscal deficit and the deterioration in the external account balance. Grenada shares a common central bank and a common currency (the East Caribbean dollar) with seven other members of the Organisation of Eastern Caribbean States (OECS).

Grenada has suffered from a heavy external debt problem, with government debt service payments running at about 25% of total revenues in 2017; Grenada was listed as ninth from bottom in a study of 126 developing countries.

Agriculture and exports

Grenada is an exporter of several different spices, most notably nutmeg, its top export and depicted on the national flag, and mace. Other major exports include bananas, cocoa, fruit and vegetables, clothing, chocolate and fish.

Tourism
Tourism is the mainstay of Grenada's economy. Conventional beach and water-sports tourism is largely focused in the southwest region around St George, the airport and the coastal strip. Ecotourism is growing in significance.

Grenada's many waterfalls are also popular with tourists. The nearest to St. George's is the Annandale Waterfalls; others include Mt. Carmel, Concord, Seven Sisters and Tufton Hall.

Several festivals also draw in tourists, such as Carriacou Maroon and String Band Music Festival in April, the Annual Budget Marine Spice Island Billfish Tournament, the Island Water World Sailing Week, and the Grenada Sailing Festival Work Boat Regatta.

Education

Education in Grenada consists of kindergarten, pre-primary school, primary school, secondary school and tertiary education. The government has spent 10.3% of its budget on education in 2016, the third highest rate in the world. Literacy rates are very high, with 98.6% of the population being able to read and write. Schools include:

Primary schools

Secondary schools

Tertiary education

Transport
Maurice Bishop International Airport is the country's main airport, connecting the country with other Caribbean islands, the United States, Canada, and Europe. There is also an airport on Carriacou.

Demographics

A majority of Grenadians (82%) are wholly descendants of enslaved Africans. Few of the indigenous population remained after the successful French colonization of the island in the 17th century. A small percentage of descendants of indentured workers from India were brought to Grenada between 1857 and 1885, predominantly from the states of Bihar and Uttar Pradesh. Today, Grenadians of Indian descent constitute 2.2% of the population. There is also a small community of French and English descendants. The rest of the population is of mixed descent (13%).

Grenada, like many of the Caribbean islands, is subject to a large amount of out-migration, with a large number of young people seeking more prospects abroad. Popular migration points for Grenadians include more prosperous islands in the Caribbean (such as Barbados), North American Cities (such as New York City, Toronto and Montreal), the United Kingdom (in particular, London and Yorkshire; see Grenadians in the UK) and Australia.

Religion

Figures are 2011 estimates
 Protestant 49.2%; includes
 Pentecostal 17.2%
 Seventh Day Adventist 13.2%
 Anglican 8.5%
 Baptist 3.2%
 Church of God 2.4%
 Evangelical 1.9%
 Methodist 1.6%
 other 1.2%
 Roman Catholic 36%
 none 5.7%
 unspecified 1.3%
 Jehovah's Witness 1.2%
 Rastafari 1.2%
 other (incl. Hinduism, Islam, Afro-American religions and Judaism) 5.5%

Languages
English is the country's official language but the main spoken language is either of two creole languages (Grenadian Creole English and, less frequently, Grenadian Creole French) (sometimes called 'patois') which reflects the African, European, and native heritage of the nation. The creoles contain elements from a variety of African languages, French and English.  Grenadian Creole French is mainly spoken in smaller rural areas.

Some Hindustani terms are still spoken amongst the Indo-Grenadian community descendants.

The indigenous languages were Iñeri and Karina (Carib).

Culture

Island culture is heavily influenced by the African roots of most of the Grenadians, coupled with the country's long experience of colonial rule under the British. Although French influence on Grenadian culture is much less visible than on some other Caribbean islands, surnames and place names in French remain, and the everyday language is laced with French words and the local Creole, or Patois. Stronger French influence is found in the well seasoned spicy food and styles of cooking similar to those found in New Orleans, and some French architecture has survived from the 1700s. Indian and Carib Amerindian influence is also seen, especially in the island's cuisine.

Oil down, a stew, is considered to be the national dish. The name refers to a dish cooked in coconut milk until all the milk is absorbed, leaving a bit of coconut oil in the bottom of the pot. Early recipes call for a mixture of salted pigtail, pig's feet (trotters), salt beef and chicken, dumplings made from flour, and provision like breadfruit, green banana, yam and potatoes. Callaloo leaves are sometimes used to retain the steam and add extra flavour.

Soca, calypso, and reggae are popular music genres and are played at Grenada's annual Carnival. Over the years rap music became popular amongst Grenadian youths, and there have been numerous young rappers emerging in the island's underground rap scene. Zouk is also being slowly introduced onto the island.

An important aspect of the Grenadian culture is the tradition of storytelling, with folk tales bearing both African and French influences. The character, Anancy, a spider who is a trickster, originated in West Africa and is prevalent on other islands as well. French influence can be seen in La Diablesse, a well-dressed she-devil, and Loogaroo (from "loup-garou"), a werewolf.

Sports

Olympics

Grenada has competed in every Summer Olympics since the 1984 Summer Olympics in Los Angeles. Kirani James won the first Olympic gold medal for Grenada in the men's 400 meters at the 2012 Summer Olympics in London, the silver medal in the men's 400 meters at the 2016 Summer Olympics in Rio de Janeiro and the bronze medal in the men's 400 meters at the 2020 Summer Olympics in Tokyo.

Cricket

As with other islands from the Caribbean, cricket is the national and most popular sport and is an intrinsic part of Grenadian culture. The Grenada national cricket team forms a part of the Windward Islands cricket team in regional domestic cricket, however it plays as a separate entity in minor regional matches, as well as having previously played Twenty20 cricket in the Stanford 20/20.

The Grenada National Cricket Stadium in St. George's hosts domestic and international cricket matches. Devon Smith, West Indies record holder to win the List-A West Indian domestic competition for the second time, was born in the small town of Hermitage.

In April 2007, Grenada jointly hosted (along with several other Caribbean nations) the 2007 Cricket World Cup. The Island's prime minister was the CARICOM representative on cricket and was instrumental in having the World Cup games brought to the region. After Hurricane Ivan, the government of the People's Republic of China (PRC) paid for the new $40 million national stadium and provided the aid of over 300 labourers to build and repair it. During the opening ceremony, the anthem of the Republic of China (ROC, Taiwan) was accidentally played instead of the PRC's anthem, leading to the firing of top officials.

Football

Football is also a very popular sport in Grenada.

See also

Outline of Grenada
Index of Grenada-related articles

Notes

References

Further Reading

Adkin, Mark. 1989. Urgent Fury: The Battle for Grenada: The Truth Behind the Largest US Military Operation Since Vietnam. Trans-Atlantic Publications. 
Beck, Robert J. 1993. The Grenada Invasion: Politics, Law, and Foreign Policy Decisionmaking. Boulder: Westview Press. 
Brizan, George 1984. Grenada Island of Conflict: From Amerindians to People's Revolution 1498–1979. London, Zed Books Ltd., publisher; Copyright, George Brizan, 1984.
Martin, John Angus. 2007. A–Z of Grenada Heritage. Macmillan Caribbean.

Sinclair, Norma. 2003. Grenada: Isle of Spice (Caribbean Guides). Interlink Publishing Group; 3rd edition. 
Stark, James H. 1897. Stark's Guide-Book and History of Trinidad including Tobago, Grenada, and St. Vincent; also a trip up the Orinoco and a description of the great Venezuelan Pitch Lake. Boston, James H. Stark, publisher; London, Sampson Low, Marston & Company.

External links

Official Website of the Government of Grenada
Chief of State and Cabinet Members
Grenada. The World Factbook. Central Intelligence Agency.
Grenada at UCB Libraries GovPubs.

Grenada from the BBC News.
Presentation Brothers College
Key Development Forecasts for Grenada from International Futures.
The Grenada Newsletter, 1974–1994 in the Digital Library of the Caribbean
 The dream of a Black utopia, podcast from The Washington Post. Includes interview with Dessima Williams, Grenada's former ambassador to the U.S.

 
Countries in the Caribbean
Island countries
Windward Islands
English-speaking countries and territories
Former British colonies and protectorates in the Americas
Former French colonies
Member states of the Caribbean Community
Member states of the Commonwealth of Nations
Member states of the Organisation of Eastern Caribbean States
Member states of the United Nations
Small Island Developing States
1640s establishments in the Caribbean
1649 establishments in the French colonial empire
1649 establishments in North America
1760s establishments in the Caribbean
1763 establishments in the British Empire
1763 establishments in North America
States and territories established in 1974
1970s establishments in the Caribbean
1974 establishments in North America
Countries in North America
Volcanic islands